is a 2016 Japanese anime television series based on Capcom's Monster Hunter action RPG series, specifically the spin-off entry Monster Hunter Stories. The series is produced by David Production, directed by Mitsuru Hongo and written by Natsuko Takahashi, featuring character designs by Takuya Saito and music by Masaru Yokoyama. It began airing on Fuji TV on October 2, 2016.

Plot 
Lute and his friends Cheval, Lilia, and Navirou live in Hakum Village, where chosen children learn to be Riders. Riders form a bond with friendly monsters called Monsties hatched from eggs, riding them as mounts for travel and combat. Due to monster riding being a taboo skill in a society filled with monster hunters, Hakum Village is isolated from the outside world and keeps its riding tradition a secret to all but a few privileged individuals. As Lute adventures with his friends and learns more about monster riding, a past threat remerges called the Dark Blight, infecting the nearby forest and leading to more aggressive monster attacks. A new generation of riders now has to find a way to stop the blighted monsters without having to destroy them outright.

Characters 

A young boy who aims to be the best monster rider who was brought to Hakum Village after his parents' death. Unlike the other riders, he formed kinship with a Rathalos he found himself instead of one given to him by the village.

A peculiar and egotistical Airou who accidentally stumbled across Hakum Village one day and never left. He's known for his poor direction skills, odd behavior, and love of donuts.

One of Lute's best friends known for her experimental item combinations. She originally intended to become a rider like Lute and Cheval but decided against it in favor of exploring the outside world in her future.

One of Lute's best friends, he's more quiet and reserved than Lute and Lilia. His Monsties are Rathian and Velocidrome.

A mysterious loner Rider girl that Lute and Navirou come across after leaving Hakum Village. Her Monstie is a Barioth.

A rider with a direct attitude and the only girl in Lute's class. She often chides Hyoro.

A less confident rider in Lute's class and the younger brother of Genie.

The chief of Hakum Village who also leads the kinship rite for riders.

A monster hunter that stumbles across Hakum Village.

The captain of the Scriveners, a world-exploring research group.

The teacher of the riders and trusted member of the Hakum Village community. He has an eager personality and a frequently used "top form" catchphrase. His monstie is Qurupeco.

A less confident rider in Lute's class and the younger brother of Genie.

One of the older riders who assist Mr. Dan and Hyoro's older brother. His monstie is Yian Kut-Ku.

One of the older riders who assist Mr. Dan who helps lead teambuilding exercises.

One of the older riders who assist Mr. Dan. He's often seen protecting Hakum Village from outside monster threats. His monstie is Aptonoth.

Broadcast 
The series premiered on October 2, 2016 in Fuji TV's new daytime timeslot at 8:30am, that runs on Sundays in Japan. It later premiered on UHB, OX, Tokai TV, KTV, OHK and TNC. The anime's theme song, titled "Panorama", is performed by Kanjani Eight. The series has been licensed in North America by Funimation. Crunchyroll is streaming a subtitled simulcast in some countries outside of Asia, while Funimation is streaming an English simuldub.

Season 1

 Theme Song: Panorama
 Artist: Kanjani∞
 Episodes: 1-48

Season 2

 Theme Song: Bokura Kyou mo Ikiteiru
 Artist: Johnny's West
 Episodes: 49-75

Notes

References

External links 
  
 

Monster Hunter
2016 anime television series debuts
Japanese children's animated adventure television series
Japanese children's animated fantasy television series
Anime television series based on video games
Fuji TV original programming
Works based on Capcom video games
David Production
Funimation